Istanbul is known as the City on the Seven Hills. The city has inherited this denomination from Byzantine Constantinople which – consciously following the model of Rome – was built on seven hills too.

The seven hills of Constantinople

The seven hills, all located in the area within the walls, first appeared when the valleys of the Golden Horn and the Bosphorus were opened up during the Secondary and Tertiary periods. In the Ottoman Age, as in the earlier Byzantine period, each hill was surmounted by monumental religious buildings (churches under the Byzantines, imperial mosques under the Ottomans).

Ist 
The first hill on which the ancient city of Byzantium was founded, begins from Seraglio Point and extends over the whole area containing Hagia Sophia, the Sultan Ahmed Mosque and Topkapı Palace.

IInd 
On the second hill are to be found the Nuruosmaniye Mosque, Grand Bazaar and Column of Constantine. The second hill is divided from the first by a fairly deep valley running from Babiali on the east Eminönü.

IIIrd 
The third hill is now occupied by the main buildings of Istanbul University, the Bayezid II Mosque to the south and the Süleymaniye Mosque to the north. The southern slopes of the hill descend to Kumkapi and Langa.

IVth 
The fourth hill on which stood the Church of the Holy Apostles and, subsequently, the Fatih Mosque, slopes down rather steeply to the Golden Horn on the north and, rather more gently, to Aksaray on the south.

Vth 
On the fifth hill is the Mosque of Sultan Selim. The fifth and the sixth hills are separated by the valley running down on the west to Balat on the shore of the Golden Horn.

VIth 
On the sixth hill are to be found the districts of Edirnekapı and Ayvansaray. Its gentle slopes run out beyond the line of the defense walls.

VIIth 
The seventh hill, known in Byzantine times as the Xērolophos, or "dry hill," it extends from Aksaray to the Theodosian Walls and the Marmara. It is a broad hill with three summits producing a triangle with apices at Topkapı, Aksaray, and Yedikule.

See also
List of cities claimed to be built on seven hills

References

Sources

Geography of Istanbul